Ichthyomyini is a tribe of New World rats and mice in the subfamily Sigmodontinae. The species within this tribe share the characteristics of all being carnivorous semiaquatic rodents.

Anotomys - aquatic rat
Chibchanomys 
Ichthyomys - crab-eating rats
Neusticomys - fish-eating rats
Rheomys

 
Mammal tribes